2012 NASCAR Stock V6 Series was the support series for the 2012 NASCAR Toyota Series season, which was the fourth season of the series. Twelve races were raced, all on oval tracks.

Report 

The season began in Autódromo Potosino, where the local driver, Oscar Torres, Jr. won the race. Oscar Torres, Jr. won back-to-back the race in Querétaro. The third race in Mexico City, again saw win Oscar Torres, Jr. Torres increased his gap to 16 points ahead of Javier Campos.
 In Puebla the rain avoided the classification, the grid was according to the championship. The race was again dominated by Oscar Torres, Jr., who increased his lead to 22 points. However Oscar Torres, Jr. won 8 races and Javier Campos only 1, the final gap was 25 points and Oscar Torres, Jr. was declared the 2012 season champion.

Guadalajara was supposed to return after a year's absence. However, it was cancelled and replaced by El Dorado Speedway Chihuahua, which debuted in the series.

Drivers

2012 calendar

Results

Races 

 1Qualifying cancelled by rain.

Standings 

(key) Bold - Pole position awarded by time. Italics - Pole position set by final practice results or rainout. * – Most laps led. ** – All laps led.

See also

2012 NASCAR Sprint Cup Series
2012 NASCAR Nationwide Series
2012 NASCAR Camping World Truck Series
2012 NASCAR K&N Pro Series East
2012 NASCAR Canadian Tire Series
2012 NASCAR Toyota Series
2012 Racecar Euro Series

References 

NASCAR Stock V6 Series

NASCAR Mexico Series